Jim or Jimmy Grummett may refer to:

Jim Grummett Sr. (1918–1996), English footballer for Lincoln City and Accrington Stanley in the 1940s and 1950s
Jim Grummett Jr. (born 1945), English footballer for Lincoln City, Denver Dynamos, and other clubs in the 1960s and 1970s